Robert Alphonse Picardo (born October 27, 1953) is an American actor. He is best known for playing the Cowboy in Innerspace, Coach Cutlip on The Wonder Years, Captain Dick Richard on the ABC series China Beach, the Doctor on Star Trek: Voyager and Richard Woolsey in the Stargate franchise. He is a frequent collaborator of Joe Dante and is a member of The Planetary Society's Board of Directors.

Early life
Picardo was born in Philadelphia, Pennsylvania, the son of Joe Picardo. Robert is of Italian heritage, with his father's family originating from Montecorvino Rovella, Salerno, and his mother's parents originally from Bomba in Abruzzo. He graduated from William Penn Charter School in 1971 and originally entered Yale University as a pre-medical student, but opted to act instead. He graduated with a bachelor's degree in drama from Yale University.

Picardo is an accomplished singer. While he was at Yale University, he was a member of the Society of Orpheus and Bacchus, the second longest running undergraduate a cappella group in the United States. Also while at Yale, he had a major role in the 1973 European premiere production of Leonard Bernstein's "Mass" in Vienna, conducted by John Mauceri. The production was televised by ORF and broadcast on PBS during the 1970s. His singing was also incorporated into his role in Star Trek: Voyager.

After earning his degree, he enrolled at the Circle in the Square Professional Theater Workshop. He waited tables for a few years until his theatrical work started to take off around 1976. His first breaks were appearing in the David Mamet play Sexual Perversity in Chicago, and with Diane Keaton in The Primary English Class.

In 1977, Picardo made his Broadway debut. He appeared in Gemini (1977) and Tribute (1978).

During the 1988–1991 television seasons, Picardo was simultaneously seen on the ABC Vietnam series China Beach in the role of Dr. Dick Richard, and the ABC series The Wonder Years in the role of Coach Cutlip. He is among a small group of television actors to achieve notice on two television series at the same time.

Career

Picardo made his feature film debut as Eddie Quist, the serial killer werewolf in the Joe Dante film The Howling (1981). He also had a recurring role in the sitcom Alice and played a doctor on an episode of The Golden Girls. He played a number of roles in Dante's family science fiction film Explorers (1985), and later appeared in Dante's The 'Burbs, Looney Tunes: Back in Action, Matinee, Gremlins 2: The New Batch, Small Soldiers and Innerspace. Picardo often plays roles under layers of prosthetic latex, having also played the swamp-dwelling Meg Mucklebones in Ridley Scott's film Legend. He also had a small role as a funeral director in John Landis's Amazon Women on the Moon. He voices Pfish in two Pfish & Chip shorts as seen on Cartoon Network's What-A-Cartoon! Show. Picardo also portrays the voice and face of the robotic Johnny Cab in Total Recall. He appeared in one episode of ER in 1995 as Abraham Zimble (Season 2 - Episode 6, "Days Like This").

In 1993, Picardo had a brief role as Joe "The Meat Man" Morton, a butcher and neighbor to Tim Allen's character on the sitcom Home Improvement.

In 2001, he guest starred in the 7 Days episode "Revelation", purporting to be a time traveler from seven years in the future.

In 2007, he played Principal White in Ben 10: Race Against Time. In 2007, he starred in the independent feature film by director Russ Emanuel, P.J., alongside John Heard and Vincent Pastore. He also starred in Russ Emanuel's Chasing the Green in 2008, with William Devane, Jeremy London and Ryan Hurst.

Picardo appeared on Kojak in a 1977 episode, E-Ring, as a media rep in The Pentagon, as an enraged father in Cold Case, and as a police officer in CSI: NY. He was a recurring guest star in two episodes of Season 7 of Smallville.

Outside of acting, Picardo was a member of the Board of Directors' Advisory Council of The Planetary Society from 1999 through 2015.  Beginning in 2015, he was elected to serve on the Board of Directors, itself.

Other career highlights include performing in Leonard Bernstein's Mass during its European debut tour, performing with the Yale University Society of Orpheus & Bacchus a cappella singing group as an undergraduate, and appearing in dozens of other television and film roles, including the film Our Last Days as Children.

Picardo performed the voice of Loki in the Xbox 360 video game Too Human. In 2009, he also appeared in Pushing Daisies, Chuck and Castle. Also in 2009, he played the lead role in the independent psychological thriller film Sensored. In 2010, Picardo had a cameo in the final episode of Persons Unknown, as a member of "the program"'s governing board. Picardo also voices Robert McNamara in Call of Duty: Black Ops in campaign and in the 'Zombie mode' after completing campaign on the one map, "FIVE". Picardo appeared in four episodes of The Mentalist from 2012 through 2013 as Jason Cooper, a lieutenant of cult leader Bret Styles.

Picardo also appeared on a season 6 episode of Supernatural titled "Clap Your Hands if You Believe", as a leprechaun.

In May 2014, Cartoon Hangover announced Picardo as a guest voice actor in the second season of Bravest Warriors, in the episode "The Parasox Pub".

In 2017, Picardo played Lt. Kitan's father Prof. Ildis Kitan in the first season episode of The Orville titled "Firestorm", and reprised the role in the 2019 episode "Home" together with John Billingsley who played Doctor Phlox in Star Trek: Enterprise.

Picardo appeared as himself in an episode of Schooled.

Star Trek
From 1995 to 2001, he played the role of the Emergency Medical Hologram (EMH) in the television series Star Trek: Voyager. Before being accepted for this role, Picardo initially auditioned for the role of Neelix. He later also directed two episodes. In the series, his character finally chose the name "Joe", after both the name of his wife's grandfather and Picardo's own father.

He played additional copies of the role of the EMH in the 1996 film Star Trek: First Contact and the 1997 Star Trek: Deep Space Nine episode "Doctor Bashir, I Presume?" He also played Dr. Lewis Zimmerman, the creator of the EMH, in episodes of Deep Space Nine and Voyager.

In 2002, Picardo authored The Hologram's Handbook, published by Pocket Books.

In 2007 and 2008, Star Trek: The Music was a multi-city tour with John de Lancie. Picardo and de Lancie narrated around the orchestral performance, explaining the history of the music in Star Trek.

In 2015, Picardo reprised the role of Dr. Lewis Zimmerman in the pilot episode of the fan series Star Trek: Renegades.

Stargate
In 2004, he began playing the recurring role of International Oversight Advisory (IOA) member Richard Woolsey in both Stargate SG-1 and Stargate Atlantis. His first appearance in those series was in the Stargate SG-1 episode "Heroes (Part 2)".

On February 5, 2008, it was announced that Picardo would be joining the regular cast of Stargate Atlantis full-time for the series' fifth and final season. He took over the role of mission commander of the Atlantis Expedition.

Filmography

Film

Television

Video games

Web series

References

External links

 
 
 
 The Official Robert Picardo website
 The Planetary Society Home Page
 Robert Picardo Interview (2012) at www.reviewgraveyard.com
 

1953 births
Living people
American male film actors
American male television actors
American people of Italian descent
Male actors from Philadelphia
Circle in the Square Theatre School alumni
William Penn Charter School alumni
Yale University alumni
People of Abruzzese descent
Catholics from Pennsylvania